The Ways of Life is a studio album by American country singer–songwriter Hank Locklin. It was released in July 1963 via RCA Victor Records and was produced by Chet Atkins. The Ways of Life was Locklin's seventh studio album in his recording career and contained 12 tracks of new material. Among its songs was the song "We're Gonna Go Fishin'," which became a hit on the American country charts and abroad in the United Kingdom.

Background and content
With the success of his biggest hit, "Please Help Me, I'm Falling," Hank Locklin began having a steady stream of hits in the 1960s. This included songs such as "One Step Ahead of My Past," "Happy Birthday to Me," and "We're Gonna Go Fishin'." The latter hit would be featured on The Ways of Life. The album was mostly recorded in March 1963 and the sessions were held at the RCA Victor Studio in Nashville, Tennessee. The album's sessions were produced by Chet Atkins, who had produced all of Locklin's previous albums for the RCA Victor label. The LP contained a total of 12 tracks, all of which had not been previously released. Included on The Ways of Life was cover versions of hits previously made successful by other country artists. These covers included "Candy Kisses" by George Morgan, "Slowly" by Webb Pierce, "Rosalita" by Al Dexter and "Kentucky Waltz" by Bill Monroe.

Release and reception

The Ways of Life was released in July 1963 via RCA Victor Records and was Locklin's seventh studio recording. The LP was distributed as a vinyl record, containing six songs on either side. The LP's only single, "We're Gonna Go Fishin'," had been released in May 1962. It spent a total of 11 weeks on the Billboard Hot Country and Western Sides chart before reaching number 14 in August 1962. It was also Locklin's third charting single in the United Kingdom, where it peaked at number 18 around the same time.

The Ways of Life later received positive reception from Bruce Eder of Allmusic, who reviewed the LP. Eder described the album as an array of songs that are "mostly sad and ironic quirks." He also praised Locklin's singing and the production of the album. He concluded by discussing its positives and negatives: "There might be a little energy lacking in the overall release, but the crisp, precise playing and Locklin's excellent singing (with fine and restrained vocal chorus accompaniment) just about make up for it."

Track listing

Personnel
All credits are adapted from the liner notes of The Ways of Life.

Musical personnel
 Kenneth Buttrey – drums
 Fred Carter Jr. – guitar
 Floyd Cramer – piano
 Ray Edenton – guitar
 Louis Dunn – drums
 The Jordanaires – background vocals
 Jerry Kennedy – guitar
 The Anita Kerr Singers – background vocals
 Buddy Harman – drums
 Roy Huskey – bass
 Grady Martin – guitar
 Bob Moore – bass
 Velma Smith – guitar
 Henry Strzelecki – bass
 Joseph Tanner – guitar

Technical personnel
 Chet Atkins – producer
 Bill Porter – engineer
 Lawton Williams – liner notes

Release history

References

1963 albums
Albums produced by Chet Atkins
Hank Locklin albums
RCA Victor albums